Chris Riley may refer to:
Chris Riley (golfer) (born 1973), American professional golfer on the PGA Tour
Chris Riley (rugby league) (born 1988), rugby league player
Chris Riley (priest) (born 1954), Australian priest and prominent youth worker
Chris Riley (American soccer) (born 1982), American USL Second Division soccer player
Chris Riley (New Zealand footballer) (born 1964), New Zealand international football (soccer) player
Chris Riley (Welsh footballer) (born 1939), Welsh football (soccer) player
Chris Riley (Blue Heelers), a fictional character on the Australian TV show Blue Heelers

See also
Christopher Riley (born 1967), British science writer and film maker